Amethi is a town in Amethi district in Faizabad division, of Indian state of Uttar Pradesh.

Amethi may also refer to:
 Amethi district, Uttar Pradesh
 Amethi railway station, Amethi district
 Amethi (Lok Sabha constituency), which covers Amethi district
 Amethi, Lucknow, a town and nagar panchayat in the Lucknow district in the Indian state of Uttar Pradesh

See also